Sisimpur is the Bangladeshi version of the children's television series Sesame Street. The show premiered in April 2005 on Bangladesh Television and aims to make learning enjoyable for children. The series is co-produced by Bangladesh-based Nayantara Communications and Sesame Workshop.

It was Bangladesh's first children's educational program and was expected to be seen by 4 million children in its first two years.

Production 
Local production designers localized the backdrop for the show by building a set featuring a rural street with a banyan tree and tea and sweet shops. 

USAID committed US$7 million in funding over the first three years. USAID funding for the show has continued as of 2022.

The creation of Sisimpur was described in detail in the 2005 documentary The World According to Sesame Street.

Messaging 
Content for the series was created in collaboration with local educators.

The series promotes values like self-respect, empathy, and cooperation, and subjects such as girls' education, nutrition, hygiene, safety, and cultural traditions and diversity.

The fourteenth season focused on empathy as its theme.

Characters 
Muppet characters include:
 Halum is a Bengal tiger who loves fish, fruits, and vegetables. Halum was designed by Ed Christie and built by Rollie Krewson. The character was voiced by Ashraful Ashish.
 Ikri Mikri is a small 3-year-old blue monster. Within the character's imagination are three marionettes named Bhutto, Gaanwalla, and Hatim, who act out Bangladeshi folk tales. Ikri Mikri was designed by Ed Christie and built by Ann Marie Holdgruen. This character was voiced by Quazi Nawshaba Ahmed and later Kabyakatha Proteeti.
 Shiku is a small and curious 5-year-old jackal. Shiku was designed by Ed Christie and built by Victoria Ellis. This character was voiced by Shuvangkar Das Shuvo.
 Tuktuki is an inquisitive 5-year-old girl who loves school and cricket. Tuktuki was designed by Ed Christie and built by Ann Marie Holdgruen. This character was voiced by Sayma Karim with Parvin Paru often assisting.
 Manik-Ratan: A pair of two sheep. Together they are addressed as Manik-Ratan.
 Grover
 Raya

The show has no full-body puppet character and, thus, no equivalent to Big Bird.

Human characters include:
Lal Mia: postman; the actor later died, and the character died within the show, a la Mr. Hooper.
Mukul Moira: university graduate and a nursery owner (played by Chanchal Chowdhury).
Sumona Moira: local school teacher. (played by Runa Khan)
Guni Moira: sweet shop owner (played by Syed Dulal)
Asha Moira: Guni's wife and the local librarian
Polash Moira: Guni and Asha's son.
Bahadur: postman (played by Shahadat Hossain).
Nanu: tells stories to Ikri Mikri.

Episodes 
The first season of the series featured 26 episodes, and a second roster of 36 episodes was in production as of 9 February 2001. A third season went into production April 2007. As of 2022, the show has fourteen seasons, with the fifteenth season of 26 episodes in production. Among other topics, the fifteenth season plans to address autism for the first time on the program.

The series airs four times a week on Bangladesh Television (BTV). The program airs on BTV at 9:05 am on Friday, with repeats on Saturday at 2:15 pm, Wednesday and Thursday at 5:05 pm. Sisimpur started airing on children's channel Duronto TV on July 14, 2019. Starting in 2020 the series also aired on Maasranga Television.

Reception and impact 
Within seven months of its premiere, 75% of households with a television were watching the series. The program is popular not only among its 3-6 demographic, but also among older children.

A 2005 study found that children who watched the program showed better vocabulary, counting skills, cognitive skills, life skills, and cultural knowledge compared to children who didn't.

A 2009 study found that teachers who watched the program were more likely to understand children as learning through play, and parents who watched the program tended to view children as persons who were central to a better future and who were deserving of attention and respect. Some parents attempted to include Sisimpur lessons into their own parenting styles, while others appreciated seeing values they already held on-screen in ways that were accessible to children. Parents also reported that children seemed to absorb lessons more readily from the show than from parental instruction.

Other media 
In November 2022 it was announced that ten popular Sisimpur books would be published in Braille editions.

In December 2022 the show partnered with UNESCO to promote World Heritage Sites in Bangladesh.

Accolades
 14th International Kidscreen Awards for Best Mixed Media Series

References

External links
Official Website
Sisimpur on MuppetWiki

2005 Bangladeshi television series debuts
2000s Bangladeshi television series
2010s Bangladeshi television series
Bangladeshi children's television shows
Television shows featuring puppetry
Bengali-language television programming in Bangladesh
Sesame Street international co-productions
Non-American television series based on American television series